General elections were held in Ivory Coast on 16 November 1975 to elect a President and National Assembly. At the time the country was a one-party state with the Democratic Party of Ivory Coast – African Democratic Rally (PDCI-RDA) as the sole legal party. Its leader Félix Houphouët-Boigny was elected President unopposed, whilst in the National Assembly election the PDCI-RDA won all 120 seats (increased from 100 at the previous elections). Voter turnout was reported to be 99.3% in the parliamentary election and 99.8% in the presidential election.

Results

President

National Assembly

References

Ivory
1975 in Ivory Coast
Presidential elections in Ivory Coast
One-party elections
Single-candidate elections
Elections in Ivory Coast
November 1975 events in Africa